Diachrysia chryson, the scarce burnished brass, is a moth of the family Noctuidae. The species was first described by Eugen Johann Christoph Esper in 1789. It is found in central and southern Europe (including the southern part of the British Isles), Asia Minor across the Palearctic to Japan.

Technical description and variation

P.chryson Esp. Forewing brownish fuscous tinged with purple: lines dark brown, inconspicuous; inner line waved, oblique inwards; median line visible only at costa; a large subquadrate shining brassy blotch beyond cell between veins 7 and 3, the space between it and inner margin suffused with deep golden brown, both traversed by the fine outer line, which becomes lustrous towards inner margin ; submarginal line very obscure, waved, limiting the brassy and brown patches; hindwing pale bronzy fuscous, darker towards termen. Larva green; dorsal line darker green, white-edged; some oblique whitish lateral stripes; spiracles white. The wingspan is 44–54 mm.

Biology
The moth flies from July to August depending on the location.

The larvae feed on Eupatorium cannabinum.

Subspecies
There are three recognised subspecies:
Diachrysia chryson chryson
Diachrysia chryson pales
Diachrysia chryson deltaica

References

External links

Fauna Europaea
Lepiforum e.V.
Schmetterlinge-Deutschlands.de
De Vlinderstichting 

Plusiinae
Moths of Japan
Moths of Europe
Moths of Asia
Moths described in 1789
Taxa named by Eugenius Johann Christoph Esper